Rathi Menon is a Singaporean model and beauty pageant titleholder who won the title of Miss Singapore Universe 2014 and represented her country at the Miss Universe 2014 pageant. Menon is a pharmacy technician of Indian descent.

Miss Singapore Universe 2014
Rathi was crowned Miss Singapore Universe 2014 on 22 August 2014 at the finals held at Shangri-La Hotel, beating 11 other finalists. She also bagged the accolades for Miss Brilliance and Miss Personality.

She is also the first Singaporean woman of Indian descent to win this title since 1998.

Miss Universe 2014

Menon competed at the Miss Universe 2014 pageant but was unplaced.

References

1991 births
Living people
Singaporean beauty pageant winners
Singaporean people of Indian descent
Singaporean people of Malayali descent
Miss Universe 2014 contestants